was the 53rd emperor of Japan, according to the traditional order of succession.  Junna reigned from 823 to 833.

Traditional narrative
Junna had six empresses and imperial consorts and 13 imperial sons and daughters.

Junna is traditionally venerated at his tomb; the Imperial Household Agency designates , in Nishikyō-ku, Kyoto, as the location of Junna's mausoleum.

Events of Junna's life
 810:  After the rebellion of Emperor Heizei, he became the crown prince of Emperor Saga at 25 years of age.
 30 May 823: In the 14th year of Emperor Saga's reign, he abdicated; the succession (senso) was received by Junna, Saga's younger brother and Emperor Kanmu's third son.
 22 March 833: In the 10th year of Emperor Junna's reign, the emperor abdicated; and the succession (senso) was received by his adopted son.  Shortly thereafter, Emperor Ninmyo is said to have acceded to the throne.  After Junna stepped down from the throne, two former Emperors were alive.  In this period, Saga was called the Senior Retired Emperor and Junna was known as the Junior Retired Emperor.
 11 June 840 (: Former-Emperor Junna died at the age of 55.  Following his death, Fujiwara no Yoshifusa maneuvered to have Montoku, rather than the crown prince Tsunesada, put on the throne; Junna's death set the stage for the Fujiwara clan's ascendancy.

Eras of Junna's reign
The years of Junna's reign are more specifically identified by more than one era name (nengō).
 Kōnin (810–824)
 Tenchō            (824–834)

Kugyō
 is a collective term for the very few most powerful men attached to the court of the Emperor of Japan in pre-Meiji eras.

In general, this elite group included only three to four men at a time.  These were hereditary courtiers whose experience and background would have brought them to the pinnacle of a life's career.  During Junna's reign, this apex of the Daijō-kan included:
 Sadaijin, Fujiwara no Fuyutsugu (藤原冬嗣), 825–826.
 Sadaijin, Fujiwara no Otsugu (藤原緒嗣), 832–843.
 Udaijin, Fujiwara no Otsugu (藤原緒嗣), 825–832.
 Udaijin, Kiyohara no Natsuno (清原夏野), 832–837.
 Naidaijin (not appointed)
 Dainagon, Fujiwara no Otsugu (藤原緒嗣), 821–825.
 Dainagon, Yoshimine no Yasuyo (良峯安世) (half brother of Emperor Junna), 828–830.
 Dainagon, Kiyohara no Natsuno (清原夏野), 828–832
 Dainagon, Fujiwara no Mimori (藤原三守), 829–838

Consorts and children

Empress: Imperial Princess Shōshi/Masako (正子内親王; 810–879), Emperor Saga's daughter
Second Son: Imperial Prince Tsunesada (恒貞親王), the Crown Prince (deposed in 842)
Third Son: Imperial Prince Motosada (基貞親王; 827–869)
Fourth Son: Imperial Prince Tsunefusa (恒統親王; 829-842)

Hi (Empress as posthumous honors): Imperial Princess Koshi (高志内親王; 789–809), Emperor Kanmu's daughter
First Son: Imperial Prince Tsuneyo (恒世親王; 806–826)
First Daughter: Imperial Princess Ujiko (氏子内親王; d.885),  16th Saiō in Ise Shrine (823–827)
Imperial Princess Yushi (有子内親王; d. 862)
Imperial Princess Sadako (貞子内親王: d. 834)

Court lady: Princess Otsugu (緒継女王; 787–847)

Nyogō: Nagahara no Motohime (永原原姫)

Nyogō: Tachibana no Ujiko (橘氏子), Tachibana no Nagana's daughter
 Prince

Koui: Fujiwara no Kiyoko (藤原潔子), Fujiwara no Nagaoka's daughter

Court lady: Kiyohara no Haruko (清原春子), Kiyohara no Natsuno's daughter
Imperial Princess Meishi (明子内親王; d. 854)

Court lady: Ōnakatomi no Yasuko (大中臣安子), Ōnakatomi Fuchiio's daughter
Fifth Son: Imperial Prince Yoshisada (良貞親王; d. 848)

Court lady: Ōno no Takako (大野鷹子), Ōno no Masao's daughter
Imperial Princess Hiroko (寛子内親王; d. 869)

Court lady: Tachibana no Funeko (橘船子), Tachibana no Kiyono's daughter
Imperial Princess Takaiko (崇子内親王; d. 848)

Court lady: Tajihi no Ikeko (丹犀池子), Tajihi no Kadonari's daughter
Imperial Princess Tomoko (同子内親王; d. 860)

Unknown lady
Mune no Chushi (統忠子; d. 863), removed from the Imperial Family by receiving the family name from Emperor (Shisei Kōka, 賜姓降下) in 862.

Ancestry

Notes

References
 
 
 
 Kasai, Masaki. (1991).  Tokyo: Yamakawa Shuppan-sha. ; ; 
 Ponsonby-Fane, Richard Arthur Brabazon. (1959).  The Imperial House of Japan. Kyoto: Ponsonby Memorial Society. 
 Titsingh, Isaac. (1834). Nihon Ōdai Ichiran; ou,  Annales des empereurs du Japon.  Paris: Royal Asiatic Society, Oriental Translation Fund of Great Britain and Ireland. 
 Varley, H. Paul. (1980).  Jinnō Shōtōki: A Chronicle of Gods and Sovereigns. New York: Columbia University Press. ;

See also
 Emperor of Japan
 List of Emperors of Japan
 Imperial cult

 
 

Japanese emperors
780s births
840 deaths
People of Heian-period Japan
People of Nara-period Japan
9th-century rulers in Asia
8th-century Japanese people
9th-century Japanese monarchs
Japanese retired emperors